Makhtar came from the Arabic word which means Chosen. It is used as both a surname and a given name. Notable people with the name include:

Surname:
Mokhtar Mokhtar, Egyptian footballer
Youness Mokhtar (born 1991), Dutch-Moroccan footballer

Given name:
Mokhtar Belmokhtar (born 1972), Algerian sentenced to death for murder and terrorism
Mokhtar Haouari (born 1970), Algerian-Canadian sentenced to 24-years imprisonment for terrorism
Mokhtar Kechamli (born 1962), Algerian football manager and former player
Mokhtar Lamhene (born 1990), Algerian football player
Mukhtar al-Thaqafi (c. 622–687),  an early Shia Islamic revolutionary based in Kufa, Iraq

See also
Mukhtar (name)